Gregory Mcdonald (February 15, 1937 – September 7, 2008) was an American writer best known for his mystery adventures featuring investigative reporter Irwin Maurice "Fletch" Fletcher.

Two of the Fletch books earned Edgar Awards from the Mystery Writers of America: Fletch was named Best First Novel in 1975, and Confess, Fletch won for Best Paperback Original in 1977.  This is the only time a novel and its sequel won back-to-back Edgars. Mcdonald would go on to write seven more novels in the Fletch series, as well as spinoffs and other standalone novels. The original book became a 1985 movie of the same name starring Chevy Chase.

Career

Mcdonald was born in Shrewsbury, Massachusetts and attended Harvard.  While working as a high school teacher, he wrote and published his first novel, Running Scared (1966), a dramatic story of a college student's suicide.  His credential as a published novelist helped him get a job as a journalist for the Boston Globe in the late 1960s. 

His first mystery novel, Fletch, published in 1974, introduced the titular character, an ex-Marine who becomes a wisecracking, womanizing California-based investigative reporter adept at undercover work.   In the second Fletch novel, Confess, Fletch (1976), Mcdonald introduced his second signature protagonist, Inspector Francis Xavier Flynn, a brilliant but eccentric Boston Police homicide detective, who would go on to appear in four of his own spin-off novels. The Fletch series also spawned the Son of Fletch series, in which Mcdonald introduced the character of Jack Faoni, the illegitimate son of Irwin Maurice Fletcher. In addition, Mcdonald wrote two mysteries set in Tennessee  in the Skylar series and a number of non-series (and non-mystery) novels.

Most of Mcdonald's mysteries mixed doses of humor and satire alongside the adventure and whodunit plots.  Three of the later Fletch novels, Fletch and the Widow Bradley, Fletch Won and Fletch Too were prequels set in a period in which Fletch was still a struggling young journalist, rather than the wealthy adventurer/troubleshooter he became after the events of Fletch.

Adaptations

A 1972 British film co-written and directed by David Hemmings was adapted from Mcdonald's first novel, Running Scared.

In 1985, the first novel in the Fletch series was adapted into a movie with Chevy Chase playing the irreverent investigative reporter. Although Mcdonald had never seen Chevy Chase perform in anything substantial, he readily agreed to the casting of the actor in the role, and had nothing but praise for his performance. Chase would reprise his role in the 1989 sequel Fletch Lives (based on the Fletch character, but not adapted from any Mcdonald novel).  There were no further Fletch films until the series was rebooted years after Mcdonald's death with Confess, Fletch (2022) starring Jon Hamm.  

His 1991 neo-western novel The Brave was adapted into an unsuccessful 1997 film directed by and starring Johnny Depp.

Personal life
In the mid-1980s, he moved to Pulaski, Tennessee, where he bought an antebellum farm and became involved in local politics, specifically anti-Klan work. (Pulaski was the birthplace of the KKK.) 

He died at his home from prostate cancer in 2008. Aside from his wife, Cheryle Higgins, whom he married in 2001, Mcdonald was survived by a sister, two sons, three stepsons and grandchildren. His first marriage ended in divorce.

Bibliography

Irwin Maurice "Fletch" Fletcher series
Fletch (1974)
Confess, Fletch (1976)
Fletch's Fortune (1978)
Fletch and the Widow Bradley (1981)
Fletch's Moxie (1982)
Fletch and the Man Who (1983)
Carioca Fletch (1984)
Fletch Won (1985)
Fletch, Too (1986)

Son of Fletch series
Son of Fletch (1993)
Fletch Reflected (1994)

Francis Xavier Flynn series
Flynn (1977)
The Buck Passes Flynn (1981)
Flynn's In (1984)
Flynn's World (1999 as e-book; 2003 on paper)

Skylar series
Skylar (1995)
Skylar in Yankeeland (1997)

Standalone novels
Running Scared (1964)
Love Among the Mashed Potatoes apa Dear M.E. (1978)
Who Took Toby Rinaldi? (US title)/Snatched (UK title) (1980)
Safekeeping (1985)
A World Too Wide (1987)
Exits and Entrances (1988)
Merely Players (1988)
The Brave (1991)
Wise Saws (unpublished)

Other
The Education of Gregory Mcdonald: Sketches from the Sixties. Writings About America, 1966-1973 (1985)
Souvenirs of a Blown World: Sketches from the Sixties: Writings About America, 1966-1973, Seven Stories Press, 2009;  collection of his writings for the Boston Globe

Film adaptations
Running Scared (1972) starring Robert Powell and Gayle Hunnicutt
Fletch (1985) starring Chevy Chase
Fletch Lives (1989) starring Chevy Chase (original screenplay by Leon Capetanos based on the Mcdonald character)
The Brave (1997) starring Johnny Depp and Marlon Brando
Confess, Fletch (2022) starring Jon Hamm

References

External links
Official website

1937 births
2008 deaths
Harvard University alumni
20th-century American novelists
American male novelists
American mystery writers
Edgar Award winners
Novelists from Massachusetts
People from Shrewsbury, Massachusetts
20th-century American male writers
People from Pulaski, Tennessee
Deaths from prostate cancer
Deaths from cancer in Tennessee